Carl Stewart may refer to:

 Carl E. Stewart (born 1950), American judge
 Carl Stewart (American football) (born 1985), American football fullback
 Carl Stewart (footballer) (born 1997), English footballer
 Carl J. Stewart Jr. (born 1936), member of the North Carolina House of Representatives